Namjung (Chinese: 娜木鐘, Manchu: ᠨᠠᠮ ᠵᡠᠩ, d .1674) of the Abaga Borjigit clan, formally known as Noble Consort Yijing (懿靖貴妃), was the wife of Ligdan Khan, who after his death became a concubine of Hong Taiji.

Life 
Her personal name was Namjung (娜木鐘).

Family Background 
Noble Consort Yijing's family was prestigious. She was a Mongol woman from the Abaga Borjigit clan (博爾濟吉特氏) from the Inner Mongolia region. Her father was Prince Abagai of the Second Rank (阿霸垓郡王). She had two sisters: one of them married Sereng Erdeni (塞冷額爾德尼), and the other, whose personal name was Ahai (阿海), married Chechen han Sholei (碩壘).

Ligden Khan Era 
It is unknown when she became a consort of Ligden Khan, Khagan of Northern Yuan dynasty. She was granted the title of Primary Consort Duoluo, later changed to Primary Consort Nangnang (囊囊福晉). Her husband died in 1634 and one year later, in 1635, she gave birth to his son named Abunai (阿布奈). It is possible that she also had a daughter as there is another record of her raising a Mongolian woman after she became one of the wives of Hong Taiji.

Chongde Era 
After Ligden Khan died, Hong Taiji married Lady Namjung and Lady Batmadzoo as his concubines. Her residence was Linzhi Palace (麟趾宮), located in the west side of Qingning Palace (宮清寧宮) of the Shenyang Imperial Palace Lady Namjung was conferred the title of Noble Consort. On 30 April 1636, she gave birth to the 11th daughter of Hong Taiji, Princess Duanshun of the First Rank. Later, she gave birth Bomubogor on 20 January 1642.

Abaga Borjigit Namjung died in 1674 and was awarded the title of Noble Consort Yijing. She was buried im the Zhaoling garden (清昭陵).

Titles 

 During the reign of the Buyan Sechen Khan (1592–1604):
 Lady Abaga Borjigit (博爾濟吉特氏)
 During the reign of the Ligden Khutugtu Khan (r.1604–1634):
 Primary Consort Duoluo (多羅多羅大福晉)
 Primary Consort Nangnang (囊囊福晉)
 During the reign of Hong Taiji (r. 1636 – 1643): 
 Noble Consort (貴妃, from 1363)
 Noble Consort Yijing  (懿靖貴妃, from 1674)

Issue 
As Primary Consor Nangnang:
 Abunai (阿布奈; 1635 – 1675), Prince Chahar of the First Rank (察哈尔亲王), Ligden Khan's second son
 Shuchai (淑侪), Ligden Khan's possible daughter
As Noble Consort:
 Princess Duanshun of the First Rank (固倫端順公主; 30 April 1636 – July/August 1650), Hong Taiji's 11th daughter
 Bomubogor, Prince Xiangzhao of the First Rank (襄昭親王 博穆博果爾; 20 January 1642 – 22 August 1656), Hong Taiji's 11th son

See also 

 Ranks of Imperial Consorts in China#Qing
 Qing dynasty nobility

References 

 
 Veritable Records of Qing, Record of Shizu, Vol.69

1674 deaths
Year of birth unknown
17th-century people
Consorts of Hong Taiji
Year of birth missing